Washington Boulevard may refer to:

 Washington Boulevard (Los Angeles), California
 Washington Boulevard (Baltimore), Maryland
 Washington Boulevard Historic District, Detroit, Michigan
 Washington Boulevard (Arlington), Virginia

See also
 Washington Avenue (disambiguation)
 Washington Street (disambiguation)